The 12th Golden Bell Awards was held on 26 March 1976 at the Armed Forces Cultural Center in Taipei, Taiwan.

Winners

References

1976
1976 in Taiwan